The Joisar (also spelt Joishar, Joisir, Joysar, Joysir) are a sub-caste of the Bhanushali community in India.

Indian castes
Social groups of Gujarat